The discography of The Get Up Kids, an American rock band that formed in 1995, consists of six studio albums, five singles, one live album and seven extended plays.

Shortly after forming in their hometown of Kansas City, Missouri, the band signed to Doghouse Records and released their first EP, Woodson, along with their debut full-length studio album Four Minute Mile (1997). After the success of their first album, the band was picked up by then-underground label Vagrant Records, where they recorded Red Letter Day, their second EP, followed by their second album Something to Write Home About. The album was a massive success, selling 134,000 copies in its first three years of release in the US. They supported the album for three years with tours and two singles; "Ten Minutes" and "Action & Action". In order to capitalize on the success of the album, Vagrant released Eudora, a compilation of b-sides, covers and rarities in 2001.

In 2002, they released their third studio album On a Wire. The album was a large departure from their previous sound, and was considered a commercial failure. In 2004, they released their fourth album Guilt Show to better critical reception. A year later, they released Live! @ The Granada Theater, the band's first and only live album. Later that year, the band broke up after one final tour. However, in 2008 the band reunited, and announced a reunion tour for 2009 to coincide with a tenth-anniversary re-release of Something to Write Home About.

Albums

Studio albums

Live albums

Compilation albums

Extended plays

Split extended plays
The Get Up Kids are widely considered to be one of the more prominent groups to take part in the second-wave emo movement that took place in the mid-1990s. In their early years, they toured with such influential emo bands as Jimmy Eat World, The Promise Ring and Braid, later touring with such groups as Superchunk, The Anniversary and Hot Rod Circuit. During that time, they often collaborated with other groups, putting out split EPs on 7" vinyl.

Singles

Music videos

Other appearances

References

External links

The Get Up Kids at Musicbrainz

Discography
Discographies of American artists
Rock music group discographies